The Anglican Diocese of Bendigo is a diocese of the Anglican Church of Australia. It is situated in the Bendigo region of the state of Victoria, Australia. Its geographic remit extends from that part of Victoria that lies north of the Great Dividing Range and west of the Goulburn River to the border with the state of South Australia. The diocesan cathedral is St Paul's Cathedral, Bendigo. The diocese was separated from the Diocese of Melbourne in 1902, with Henry Archdall Langley installed as the first bishop. The current bishop, Matt Brain, was installed on 17 February 2018.

History
The diocese was separated from the Diocese of Melbourne in 1902, at the same time as the creation of the dioceses of Wangaratta and Gippsland. In 1977, the Diocese of St Arnaud, which had been separated from the Diocese of Ballarat in 1926, was disbanded and merged with Bendigo.

The original cathedral church of the diocese was All Saints, Bendigo, but since 1981 the cathedral church has been St Paul's. Since 17 February 2018 the Bishop of Bendigo has been the Right Reverend Matt Brain.

The Gannawarra Cluster is an initiative by the diocese in providing a team of locally ordained clergy to offer ministry to three geographically connected parishes, Cohuna, Kerang and Quambatook.

Bishops of Bendigo

Deans of Bendigo
 1902 John Christian MacCullagh (1st Dean of Bendigo)
 1917 Wilfred Ernest Holtzendorff Percival
 1928 Donald Haultain
 1932 Edward Schweiger
 1940 Wilfred Frederick Dau
 1951 Charles Frederick Hulley
 1956 The Rt Revd Charles Lawrence Riley
 1957 The Rt Revd Ronald Edward Richards
 1973 Alex G. McKenzie
 1980 Ray Elliott
 1986 John Bedford
 1989 - 1993 John W. Stewart
 2006 Peta Sherlock
 2012 John Roundhill
 2018 Elizabeth Dyke

See also
South East Bendigo

References

External links
 Diocese of Bendigo website
 St Paul's Cathedral, Bendigo
 Parish of South East Bendigo
 Gannawarra Cluster

Bendigo
1902 establishments in Australia
Bendigo
Anglican bishops of Bendigo
Deans of Bendigo
Archdeacons of Bendigo
Archdeacons of The Murray
Archdeacons of Kyneton